Ectoedemia trifasciata is a moth of the family Nepticulidae. It was described by Shōnen Matsumura in 1931. It is known from the Russian Far East and Japan (including Hokkaido).

References

External links

Nepticulidae
Moths of Japan
Moths of Asia
Taxa named by Shōnen Matsumura
Moths described in 1931